Wise Kativerata is a Fijian professional rugby league coach who is the head coach of Fiji and a former professional rugby league footballer who played in the 2000s for the Fiji national rugby league team. 

He also played Rugby Union for the NSW Waratahs and Australian Sevens Team

Playing career
Kativerata made his first grade debut for St George in Round 13 2001.  In 2003, Kativerata joined South Sydney and scored 6 tries in 9 games for the club as they finished last on the table claiming the wooden spoon.  In 2004, Kativerata joined Parramatta and made 2 appearances for the club.  His last game in first grade was a 26-18 victory over Brisbane in Round 2 2004.

References

1977 births
Living people
Australia international rugby sevens players
Expatriate rugby union players in Australia
Fiji national rugby league team coaches
Fiji national rugby league team players
Fijian expatriate rugby union players
Fijian expatriate sportspeople in Australia
Fijian rugby league players
Fijian rugby union players
I-Taukei Fijian people
Male rugby sevens players
New South Wales Waratahs players
Parramatta Eels players
Rugby league wingers
South Sydney Rabbitohs players
Sportspeople from Suva
St. George Illawarra Dragons players